False Black Power ? is a 2017 book by conservative journalist Jason L. Riley. In the book, Riley asserts that despite African American gains in political power overtime, culminating in the first black president, Barack Obama did not produce tangible socioeconomic improvement for African Americans. Moreover, Riley argues that the opposite happened and as a group, African Americans  progressed at a slower rate than whites.

References 

2017 non-fiction books
21st-century history books
American history books
American political books